The 1912 United States presidential election in Vermont  took place on November 5, 1912, as part of the 1912 United States presidential election which was held throughout all contemporary 48 states. Voters chose four representatives, or electors to the Electoral College, who voted for president and vice president. 

Vermont was won by the Republican nominees, incumbent President William Howard Taft from Ohio, and his running mate Vice President James S. Sherman from New York. Taft and Sherman defeated the Progressive Party candidates, former President Theodore Roosevelt from New York and his running mate California Governor Hiram Johnson, and the Democratic nominees, New Jersey Governor Woodrow Wilson and Indiana Governor Thomas R. Marshall.

Taft won the state with a plurality of 37.13%, to Roosevelt’s 35.22%, with Wilson in third place at 24.43%. Taft’s victory margin over Roosevelt was 1.91%.

Historically, Vermont was a bastion of liberal Northeastern Republicanism, and by 1912 the Green Mountain State had gone Republican in every presidential election since the founding of the Republican Party. From 1856 to 1908, Vermont had had the longest streak of voting Republican of any state, having never voted Democratic before, and this tradition continued in 1912.

Vermont was one of only two states (along with Utah) to vote for incumbent Republican President William Howard Taft, who was pushed into third place nationally by the strong third-party candidacy of Theodore Roosevelt, a former Republican president who formed his own Bull Moose Party after a failed challenge to Taft for the Republican nod. Taft and Roosevelt split the Republican vote nationally in 1912, with Roosevelt coming in second place behind Wilson nationwide and carrying six states. However, Vermont Republicans proved to be mostly loyal to President Taft as the official Republican nominee, allowing Taft to edge out Roosevelt narrowly to carry the state, leaving Wilson a distant third. Were Taft and Roosevelt voters united behind a single Republican candidate, they would have combined to over 72% of the vote in Vermont. 

Socialist candidate Eugene V. Debs, who got 6% of the election vote nationally in 1912, performed much poorer in Vermont with just 1.48% of the vote and finishing in fifth place in Vermont, which was even lower than the 1.74% of the vote won by Prohibition candidate Eugene W. Chafin who finished in fourth in Vermont. However, in the city of Barre, Debs got 24% of the vote, and also got over 12% of the vote within the surrounding town of Barre. Both Barre City and Barre Town are within Washington County, which was Debs' best county in the state by some distance with 5.50%, but which was still below his 6% vote in the election across the nation as a whole. Barre City is the home of the Socialist Labor Party Hall, which was a location for debates among socialists, anarchists and trade union leaders over the future direction of the labor movement in the United States in the early 20th century.

Vermont was the third most Republican state in the nation in 1912, only beaten by Utah and neighboring New Hampshire. However, Taft’s margin over Wilson was much greater in Vermont than in Utah or any other state.

With Taft only winning 37.13% of the vote, he became the first Republican presidential candidate to win Vermont's popular vote with only a plurality. This was also the only time such occurred until Ronald Reagan won Vermont in 1980 with only a plurality of 44.37% of the popular vote. In addition, this was also one of only two times in the state's history (the other being George H. W. Bush's 3.52% victory margin in 1988) that Vermont was decided by a margin of less than 5.00%

Taft carried seven counties in Vermont to Roosevelt’s six, while Wilson won only tiny Grand Isle County in the far northwest of the state, with a plurality of less than 40% of the vote. This was the first time since Lewis Cass carried Washington County in 1848 that a Democrat had carried any of Vermont’s counties as well as the first time since Free Soil Party candidate John P. Hale won Lamoille County in 1852 that a third-party candidate carried any of Vermont’s counties and the most recent time such has occurred to date. Consequently, this is the first election since the Republican Party's formation in 1854 that the party failed to win every county in the state.

Vermont was Wilson's weakest state in the nation in terms of percentage of the vote, and was one of only two states where Wilson finished as low as third in 1912, the other being Michigan where Wilson finished a much closer third behind Taft. Since 1912, there has been only one occasion (Bill Clinton in Utah in 1992) where a winning presidential candidate came in third in any of the states that had not seceded into the Confederate States of America.

Results

Results by county

See also
 United States presidential elections in Vermont
 1912 United States presidential election in Utah - President William Howard Taft's other sole win in 1912

Notes

References

Vermont
1912
1912 Vermont elections